Benitachell or El Poble Nou de Benitatxell is a municipality in the comarca of Marina Alta in the Valencian Community, Spain.

Lady Elizabeth School, a British international school, has its junior school campus in Benitachell.

References

Municipalities in the Province of Alicante
Marina Alta